Gajendra Prasad Himanshu is a veteran socialist leader from Bihar, India. Seven times he has been elected M.L.A. from Hasanpur (in years 1967, 1969, 1972, 1977, 1980, 1990 & 2000).

He is considered to be one of the very honest and principled politicians in Bihar. Twice he had rejected the offer to become Chief Minister  at the cost of breaking his party and taking support from congress. Due to his non controversial and clean  image he is respected by all the leaders from his own and other  parties as well. He is highly influenced by the ideologies of Dr. Ram Manohar Lohia.

In year 1977, he became minister of state irrigation, Government of Bihar. He was deputy speaker of Bihar Legislative Assembly from 1980 to 1985. In 1990, he became cabinet minister of Public Health and Engineering Department (PHED), Bihar.

He was nominated as speaker of Bihar Assembly in year 2000, by Janata Dal (United) Government. However, the nomination was withdrawn last minute to retain the sanctity of the House particularly that of the chair’s post and would not like to contest the election just to create a precedence.

References

Living people
1942 births
People from Samastipur district
Deputy Speakers of the Bihar Legislative Assembly
Bihar MLAs 1967–1969
Bihar MLAs 1969–1972
Bihar MLAs 1972–1977
Bihar MLAs 1977–1980
Bihar MLAs 1980–1985
Bihar MLAs 1990–1995
Bihar MLAs 2000–2005
Samyukta Socialist Party politicians
Janata Party politicians
Janata Dal politicians
Janata Dal (United) politicians